Karlo Filipović (born 10 July 1954) was the President of the Federation of Bosnia Herzegovina from 27 February 2001 to 1 January 2002. He served as Vice-President of the Federation of Bosnia and Herzegovina from 1 January 2002 to 27 January 2003.

References

Living people
1954 births
Presidents of the Federation of Bosnia and Herzegovina
Vice Presidents of the Federation of Bosnia and Herzegovina
Politicians of the Federation of Bosnia and Herzegovina